Stardew may refer to:

Stardew Valley, a 2016 video game
 "Stardew", a song by Purity Ring from their 2020 album Womb